Dave Van Ronk in Rome is a live album by Dave Van Ronk, released in 1983. It was released on the Italian label Folkstudio.

The Dave Van Ronk discography states it was re-issued as From... Another Time & Place. The track list is the same.

Track listing

Side one
"Kansas City Blues" (Traditional) 
"Down South Blues" (Traditional) 
"Bad Dream Blues" (Van Ronk)
"Losers" (Van Ronk) 
"Long John" (Traditional) 
"He Was a Friend of Mine" (Bob Dylan)

Side two
"Another Time & Place" (Van Ronk)
"Lovin' Spoonful" (Davis)
"Hoochie Coochie Man" (Willie Dixon) 
"The Old Man" (Dylan)
"Frankie's Blues" (Van Ronk) 
"Honey Hair" (Van Ronk)

Personnel
Dave Van Ronk – vocals, guitar

References

1983 albums
Dave Van Ronk albums